Hypericum bupleuroides is a species of perennial flowering plant in the St. John's wort family, Hypericaceae. It is the sole species in the section Hypericum sect. Bupleuroides.

Description
The species grows up to 75 centimeters tall. It has red or black stems and five petals, also red or black.

Distribution
The species is found in northeast Turkey and Russia, although it is very rare.

References

bupleuroides
Flora of Turkey
Flora of Russia